Karl Jansen (28 May 1908 – 13 November 1961) was a German weightlifter who competed in the 1936 Summer Olympics. He was born in Wanne-Eickel. In 1936 he won the bronze medal in the lightweight class.

References
 

1908 births
1961 deaths
People from Herne, North Rhine-Westphalia
Sportspeople from Arnsberg (region)
German male weightlifters
Olympic weightlifters of Germany
Weightlifters at the 1936 Summer Olympics
Olympic bronze medalists for Germany
Olympic medalists in weightlifting
Medalists at the 1936 Summer Olympics
20th-century German people